The Lead (Chinese: 第一主角) is a 30-episode Singaporean drama produced and telecast on Mediacorp Channel 8. The show aired at 9pm on weekdays and had a repeat telecast at 8am the following day. The show is Channel 8's mid-year blockbuster for 2017 to remember Mediacorp at Caldecott Hill and to celebrate 35 anniversary years of television dramas. It stars Rebecca Lim, Shaun Chen, Andie Chen and Julie Tan as main cast.

Plot
Ah Zhen (Rebecca Lim) has three childhood friends, Guang Hui (Shaun Chen), De Ping (Andie Chen) and An Ya (Julie Tan). Like Ah Zhen, they also love watching drama, and yearned to be seen on the TV screen. The four friends even made a pact together: To make it big in the drama scene, to play the lead character in a drama someday!

After graduating from secondary school, the four friends joined the TV station's acting classes, and all of them, except Ah Zhen, were selected to join the TV station as actors. Even though she was disappointed, Ah Zhen refused to give up, and began a journey full of hardships in the local drama scene.

Initially Ah Zhen worked alongside her father Xiao Hu (Chen Hanwei), who was a martial art stuntman. Unfortunately she was clumsy and always got injured, so she had to switch to being an extra. But even as an extra, she always somehow got in the way and was disliked and shunned by the production team. But Ah Zhen refused to leave the TV station, and found herself a job in the Costume department.

Childhood friend Guang Hui clinched his first lead role, and An Ya and De Ping had also taken up supporting roles, yet Ah Zhen was still struggling to survive. She switched from department to department: make-up, Props, Radio... trying to find a path for herself, but it seems like she was drifting further from her original dream of becoming an actress. Luckily at that time, she met her savior, the then “Ah-jie” of local drama scene, Chen Xiang Rong (Xiang Yun), a woman whom Ah Zhen saw as her own mother. Under the help of Xiang Rong, Ah Zhen managed to get a small supporting role in her first ever drama debut.

Since then, Ah Zhen began her career as a freelance actor, taking part in a number of classic productions. But Ah Zhen was insistent in her own method of acting, which many others could not agree to. By then, Guang Hui was already a popular rising star, and An Ya was radiant and eye catching after her cosmetic procedure, so the two co-starred in a few dramas, and they became the best on screen couple of their time. Ah Zhen was happy for her friends’ achievements, but she couldn't help but feel a little heartbroken. Actually, Ah Zhen has always been fond of Guang Hui since her teenage years, but Guang Hui never really noticed her.

At the lowest point in Ah Zhen's life, and she felt like she was abandoned by the entire world. But with encouragement from her friends, she eventually got up on her feet again. This time, Ah Zhen decided to focus on her job behind the scenes instead!

Working as the assistant producer was the turning point of Ah Zhen's life. As she had worked in various departments previously, she had contacts everywhere in the production team, making life as an AP easier. She took part in various popular dramas, and with a brush of luck, she always managed to accidentally create epic scenes in the dramas. Eventually, she worked her way up to a director.

As the years go by, many things were no longer what they used to be. The TV station separated into two competing stations, and the friendship between the four broke down. Guang Hui was leading a wasted life, gambling and drinking away, and losing money in unsuccessful investments, eventually leading to a broken family. After separating from Guang Hui, An Ya took to the international screen, but was faced with aftereffects of excessive cosmetic surgery, threatening her acting career. De Ping was involved in a sex scandal and was fired by the TV station, and even ended up in jail for 2 months.

Seeing that their friendship was severely challenged, Ah Zhen, the only one who has not changed, tried very hard to bring the other three back together. After all these ups and downs, will the perseverance of Ah Zhen eventually recover the lost friendship between them?

Ah Zhen has always been secretly loving Guang Hui, but she always misses the opportunity to bring their friendship to another level. How will their relationship end up? An Ya and Guang Hui were the promising couple, but love grew into hate, and they went separate ways, though they never truly forgotten each other. Will they ever reconcile? Ah Zhen and De Ping are friends in times of need, supporting each other faithfully through all these times. Will their relationship eventually bear fruit?

Will this complicated four-sided relationship finally come to a happy ending?

Cast

Main cast

Supporting Cast

TV Station's Celebrities/ Extras

TV Station's Heads

TV Station's Instructors Directors/ Reporters/ Producers

Other/Cameo Casts

Original Sound Track (OST)

Awards & Nominations

Star Awards 2018

The Lead is up for 5 nominations.

The other drama serials also nominated for Best Theme Song nomination with Dear DJ, Life Less Ordinary , Dream Coder & When Duty Calls.

It won 3 out of 5 nominations. It swept almost all the awards except for Best Director and Best Theme Song.

Development
 Filming Starts in November 2016 and wraps in March 2017

See also 
 List of MediaCorp Channel 8 Chinese drama series (2010s)
List of The Lead (TV Series) episodes

References 

Singaporean television series
2017 Singaporean television series debuts
2017 Singaporean television series endings
Channel 8 (Singapore) original programming